Martin Rohleder (1943 – 3 November 1963) was a British retired slalom canoeist who competed in the early-to-mid 1960s. He won a bronze medal in the folding K-1 team event at the 1963 ICF Canoe Slalom World Championships in Spittal. Rohleder was from Altrincham.

Rohleder died in an accident on 3 November 1963, aged 20. A memorial trophy in his name was inaugurated the following year.

References

External links 
 Martin ROHLEDER at CanoeSlalom.net

British male canoeists
1943 births
1963 deaths
Medalists at the ICF Canoe Slalom World Championships